Fatih Serkan Kurtuluş (born 1 January 1990) is a Turkish football player.

Club career
He transferred to Galatasaray on 3 September 2008, signing a five-year contract, having previously played for Bursaspor.

Kurtuluş made his first competitive debut for Galatasaray on 18 September 2008 in a match against AC Bellinzona, playing the first half and providing an assist for Harry Kewell's goal. He made his league debut for Galatasaray on 6 March 2009, in a match against his former club Bursaspor.

Personal life
Serkan's brother, Serdar Kurtuluş, is also a retired professional footballer.

Career statistics

References

External links
 
 

1990 births
Living people
People from Yıldırım
Turkish footballers
Turkey B international footballers
Turkey under-21 international footballers
Turkey youth international footballers
Süper Lig players
TFF First League players
TFF Second League players
Bursaspor footballers
Galatasaray S.K. footballers
Galatasaray A2 footballers
Association football fullbacks
Elazığspor footballers
Büyükşehir Belediye Erzurumspor footballers
Göztepe S.K. footballers
Karşıyaka S.K. footballers
Kayserispor footballers
Gençlerbirliği S.K. footballers